Bobbie the Wonder Dog (1921–1927) was a dog who covered   on his own to return home to Silverton, Oregon, United States, after he was lost while his owners were visiting family in Wolcott, Indiana.

Background
In August 1923, Frank and Elizabeth Brazier, with their daughters Leona and Nova, were visiting relatives in Wolcott, Indiana. Their two-year-old Scotch Collie/English Shepherd mix dog Bobbie was attacked by three other dogs and ran away. After an exhaustive search, the heartbroken Brazier family were unable to find Bobbie and continued their trip before returning home to Oregon, expecting never to see their dog again.

Journey home 
In February 1924, six months later, Bobbie returned to Silverton mangy, dirty,  and scrawny, with his toenails worn down to nothing. He showed all the signs of having walked the entire distance, including swimming rivers and crossing the Continental Divide during the coldest part of winter.

After his return to Silverton, he experienced a meteoric rise to fame. His story drew national attention and was featured in numerous newspapers.

He was the subject of newspaper articles including Ripley's Believe It or Not!, books, and film. Bobbie played himself in the 1924 silent film The Call of the West. He received hundreds of letters from people around the world and was honored with a jewel-studded harness and collar, ribbons, and keys to cities.

People who had fed and sheltered Bobbie on his journey wrote the family to tell about their time with Bobbie. The Humane Society of Portland was able to use these stories to assemble a relatively precise description of the route Bobbie took. 

The humane society concluded that after returning to Wolcott and unable to find his owners, Bobbie initially followed their further travels into northeast Indiana. He then struck out in several directions, apparently seeking their scent. He eventually headed west.

During their original trip, the Braziers had parked their car in a service station each night. Their dog visited each of these stops on his journey, along with a number of homes, and a homeless camp.

In Portland, an Irish woman took care of him for a period of time, helping him recover from serious injuries to his legs and paws.

Death and legacy
Upon his death in 1927, he was buried with honors at the Oregon Humane Society's pet cemetery in Portland. A week later, German Shepherd film star Rin Tin Tin laid a wreath at his grave. His grave is sheltered by a "fancy white and red dog house" received during a promotional appearance at the Portland Home Show. The gravestone has been moved outside the house for better viewing.

Bobbie's demonstration of loyalty is celebrated during Silverton's annual children's pet parade that serves as a reminder of the special place animals and pets have in people's lives. The event was started several years after Bobbie's death and the first parade was led by his son, Pal. A  outdoor painting featuring Bobbie's story is part of a series of murals that decorate the walls of businesses in Silverton. 

In late 2012, responding to public sentiment that his burial location in Portland did not properly honor his story and his connection to his hometown, a grassroots movement was started by a group of Silvertonians with the goal of repatriating Bobbie's remains to Silverton, for reburial and memorialization.

See also
 List of individual dogs

Notes

References

Further reading

External links
 Detail of Silverton Bobbie mural from Susan Stelljes 
 Index of articles about Bobbie from City of Silverton website (archive)

1921 animal births
1927 animal deaths
Individual dogs in the United States
Missing or escaped animals
Oregon culture
Silverton, Oregon